Nikola Gruevski (pronounced ; ; born 31 August 1970) is a Macedonian politician who served as Prime Minister of Macedonia from 2006 until his resignation, which was caused by the 2016 Macedonian protests, and led the VMRO-DPMNE party from 2004 to 2017.

Under the Pržino Agreement mediated by the European Union, Gruevski agreed to resign and left his post on 18 January 2016.

In May 2018 he was sentenced to two years in prison on corruption charges. In November 2018 he was ordered to serve his sentence but failed to check-in with authorities and instead fled to Hungary, where he sought and was granted political asylum. He has been accused of promoting the controversial identity politics called antiquization. Under his leadership the country which had pro-European and pro-NATO policy, has changed sides to pro-Russian, pro-Serbian and anti-Western one. He has opposed to the Friendship treaty signed with Bulgaria in 2017 and the Prespa agreement signed with Greece in 2018, despite both neighboring states being NATO and EU members.

In April 2022, he was added to the US Treasury's Specially Designated Nationals List of individuals facing Balkans-related sanctions. Also in April, he was sentenced in Skopje to 7 years in prison on charges of money laundering and illegal acquisition and concealment of state property.

Personal life
Born in Skopje in 1970, Gruevski was brought up in a family that was neither privileged nor poor. His father worked in furniture and design and his mother was a nurse. After his parents' divorce, he was raised by his mother. At the age of four, however, she went to work in Libya, like thousands of other Yugoslav citizens, and took him with her. After their return, he completed primary and secondary education in Skopje. Having graduated from the Faculty of Economics at the St. Clement of Ohrid University in Bitola in 1994 (where he dabbled in amateur theatre and boxing) he entered the nascent finance sector, and was the first person to trade on Skopje's stock exchange. During 1995 he worked as director of department in Multigroup owned Balkanbank, and became its exhibitioner till 1998. In 1996 he also acquired qualifications for the international capital market from a London Securities Institute. He founded the Brokerage Association of Macedonia in 1998 and made the first transaction on the Macedonian Stock Exchange.

On 12 December 2006, he obtained a master's degree from the Faculty of Economics at the Ss. Cyril and Methodius University in Skopje. He divorced his first wife and was married again in May 2007 to Borkica Gruevska with whom he has two daughters: Anastasija and Sofija.

Gruevski's paternal grandparents came from the Ottoman Macedonia village of Krushoradi, where his grandfather Nikolaos Grouios (Nikola Gruev) (1911–1940) was born. Until the official Greek annexation after the Second Balkan War in 1913, it was under the jurisdiction of the Bulgarian Exarchate. The Greek administration later practised an assimilative anti-Bulgarian campaign, changing the names of local villagers to the corresponding Greek names. The village itself was renamed by the Greek authorities to Achlada in 1926. Gruevski's grandfather fought in the Greco-Italian War, where he lost his life. His name is mentioned on the war memorial in Achlada among the names of the locals who were killed during World War II. Years later, during the Greek Civil War, Gruevski's grandmother and father fled north to what was then Yugoslav Macedonia, where they changed their family name to Gruevski in order to gain citizenship through assimilation, as was the Yugoslav policy at the time.

Gruevski's maternal grandfather - Mihail D. Miyalkov was a member of the Bulgarian Action Committees in 1941 and later of a Bulgarian club founded in Ŝtip in 1942, when the area was annexed by Bulgaria during the Second World War. His mother Nadezhda is also from Ŝtip. She is a sister of the first Minister of the Interior of the Republic of Macedonia - Jordan Mijalkov. During the administration of Nikola Gruevski, his first cousin, Sašo Mijalkov was the director of the Administration for Security and Counterintelligence of the Republic of Macedonia.

Moreover, Gruevski also released a book in 2018 called "Experiences for the Future: Economic Effects of Different Types of International Capital Flows, With Particular Reference to the Republic of Macedonia"

Political career

Minister of Finance (1999–2002)
The government under Ljubčo Georgievski sold the Macedonian Telecom to Hungarian Matáv and the OKTA oil refinery to Hellenic Petroleum. Gruevski also implemented financial reforms, including the reform of the payment system and the value added tax of 18%, requiring fiscal receipts for all Macedonian businesses, which was a program designed to fight tax evasion.

Party leader (2003–2017)
Gruevski is the leader of the nationalist ruling party VMRO-DPMNE. After VMRO-DPMNE was defeated in the 2002 parliamentary election, there was a period of infighting within the party. Gruevski emerged as the pro-EU leader, and he was elected as leader of the party after Ljubčo Georgievski left the position. The former prime minister set up his own party (VMRO-People's Party), but VMRO-DPMNE retained most of the party's supporters.

Prime Minister (2006–2016)

The VMRO-DPMNE won the July 2006 parliamentary election, and on 25 August 2006 he constituted the new government. His government had many new faces, mostly in their 30s, in key ministries and other positions. In the election Gruevski earned the distinction of becoming the first elected European head of government born in the 1970s.

In June 2007, Gruevski attended a meeting in Tirana, Albania, along with President of the United States George W. Bush, Prime Minister of Albania Sali Berisha, and Prime Minister of Croatia Ivo Sanader.

The coalition led by his party, VMRO-DPMNE, won the 1 June 2008 parliamentary election, their second electoral victory in a row, winning more than half of the seats in the parliament. The polling was marred by a number of violent incidents and allegations of fraud in some ethnic Albanian dominated municipalities. Gruevski created a government with the ethnic Albanian political party Democratic Union for Integration.

The coalition led by his party, VMRO-DPMNE, won the 5 June 2011 parliamentary election, their third electoral victory in a row, winning 56 out of the 123 seats in the parliament. Objections of misuse of state resources, including the blackmail of over one hundred thousand public servants to act as agitators were neglected, and the elections were declared valid. Gruevski formed the new government, again in coalition with the Democratic Union for Integration.

On 6 January 2012, Gruevski opened the triumphal arch "Porta Macedonia" in Skopje as a monument to 20th anniversary of Macedonian independence, and admitted that he personally has been the instigator of the Skopje 2014 project.

On 27 April 2014, VMRO-DPMNE won the parliamentary election, providing Gruevski another term as Prime Minister.

In 2014, Gruevski began to rush plans through Parliament to create a tax-free autonomous trade zone that falls outside the purview of both domestic and international regulators. The move raised alarm among Parliament members. The European Union's Venice Commission commented that "If all laws (other than criminal laws) are to be enacted and enforced by a managing body rather than the constitutionally recognised lawmaker and executive, this zone becomes a sort of a 'State within a State' separate from the existing constitutional structure" and could become "a haven for 'dirty money.'" In 2015 the former Prime Minister and founder of the VMRO-DPMNE, Ljubčo Georgievski accused Gruevski's government it had a goal to serbianise the country, finally joining it to Serbia.

Wiretapping scandal and resignation
In May 2015, protests occurred in Skopje against Gruevski and his government. The demonstrations began following charges being brought against Zoran Zaev, the opposition leader, who responded by alleging that Gruevski had had 20,000 Macedonian officials and other figures wiretapped, and had covered up the murder of a young man by a police officer in 2011. A major protest occurred on 5 May, with violent clashes between activists and police, causing injuries on both sides. In the days following, the opposition claimed that more anti-government actions would occur, which they did later that month. Several ministers, including the interior minister, resigned. Gruevski initially refused to step down, saying on 16 May that "if I back down it would be a cowardly move ... I’ll face down the attacks." However, on 15 January 2016, Emil Dimitriev was nominated as Prime Minister and he assumed office on 18 January, following the arranged pre-electoral resignation of Gruevski from the position, as part of the Przino Agreement.

Post-premiership (since 2017)
In July 2017, a Macedonian court ordered the seizure of the passports of Gruevski and four other officials of his party, including former interior minister Gordana Jankuloska and former transportation minister Mile Janakieski, in connection with the wiretapping case.

In December 2017, Gruevski resigned as leader of the VMRO-DPMNE, following the party's major defeat by the Social Democratic Union in local elections.

Trial
In January 2017 the Macedonian Special Prosecutor's Office launched the 'Tank' investigation in which two individuals were accused of using their official position and authority in the period from February to October 2012 to complete an illegal public procurement of an armoured Mercedes-Benz car worth €600,000 and "fulfil the wishes" of Gruevski who was Prime Minister at the time. On 23 May 2018, Gruevski was sentenced to two years in prison for unlawfully influencing government officials in the purchase of the luxury bulletproof car.

On 9 November 2018, the Skopje Criminal Court rejected Gruevski's appeals for a postponement of his prison sentence and on 10 November he did not appear for the start of his two-year sentence. He had been last seen in Macedonia on 8 November at a hotel in Skopje. The Macedonian authorities issued an arrest warrant against the fugitive. VMRO-DPMNE's leader, Hristijan Mickoski defended Gruevski and described the arrest warrant and police search against him as "political persecution" and a "witch-hunt", adding that VMRO-DPMNE was "under police siege".

Fugitive

On 13 November, Gruevski announced through his Facebook account that he had fled to Hungary, where he applied for political asylum. Gruevski was seen as having particularly close relations with the right-wing national conservative Fidesz's head, and Prime Minister of Hungary, Viktor Orbán, who opposed the Prespa agreement between Greece and Macedonia and supported VMRO-DPMNE's hardline position against it. Orbán has reportedly described Gruevski's escape as "an interesting story, exciting, like all crime stories".

Despite his passport having been confiscated, Gruevski successfully escaped and concerns arose that he probably used a Bulgarian one. However, according to Bulgarian authorities, Gruevski has never applied for Bulgarian citizenship. It was later confirmed by Albanian police that, with the aid of the Hungarian government which escorted him using Hungarian diplomatic vehicles, Gruevski had passed through Albania, Montenegro and Serbia before arriving in Hungary.

Interpol alerted that Gruevski is wanted under an international arrest warrant and the Macedonian government filed a formal extradition request. Hungary's opposition parties are calling on the Hungarian government to arrest and quickly extradite the fugitive former prime minister back to Macedonia.

On 20 November 2018, Gruevski was granted political asylum by the Hungarian authorities.

Gruevski has condemned the Prespa agreement and stated that Prime Minister Zoran Zaev "scammed" and "tricked" the Macedonian people over the name change of the country and that Greek politicians imposed an unfavourable deal upon Macedonia that outlines exclusive claims over "antique history" by Greece.

On 27 June 2019, Gruevski appeared handcuffed in a court in Budapest on a hearing closed for the public for his extradition requested by the North Macedonian authorities. Later that day the court in Budapest announced that his extradition was rejected. According to judge Éva Várhegyi the conditions needed for his extradition were not fulfilled.

On 21 July 2020, Gruevski's position as an honorary president of VMRO-DPNME was taken away, along with other changes that were made to democratize the party. Furthermore in October 2020, Gruevski was named in a new money laundering probe launched by the authorities in North Macedonia.

Tobias Zech lobbying scandal 
On 19 March 2021, German politician Tobias Zech resigned from the Bundestag due to allegations that he received a large sum of money to campaign for former Macedonian PM Nikola Gruevski. After Gruevski escaped to Hungary, Zech continued business relations with North Macedonia through cannabis-related company PharmCann Deutschland AG in partnership with Zlatko Keskovski, a former counter-intelligence officer of North Macedonia.

Awards and recognition

Recognitions
 2014: Order St. Nicholas – Highest Award of Štip
 2015: Order Baptist (Preteca) from Saint Jovan Bigorski Monastery

Awards
 Vienna Economic Forum award – for contribution to national and regional economic development (2011)

References

Further reading
 Gruevski, Nikola and Vaknin, Sam Macedonian Economy on a Crossroads, Skopje, NIP Noval Literatura, 1998. 
 Gruevski, Nikola, The Way Out

External links

 Biography of Gruevski at the Homepage of the Government of the Republic of North Macedonia
 Book: Makedonskata ekonomija na krstopat : na patot kon pozdrava ekonomija by Nikola Gruevski and Sam Vaknin

|-

1970 births
VMRO-DPMNE politicians
Living people
Macedonian nationalists
Macedonian people of Bulgarian descent
Politicians from Skopje
Prime Ministers of North Macedonia
Finance ministers of North Macedonia
Ss. Cyril and Methodius University of Skopje alumni
Politicians convicted of corruption
Politicians convicted of fraud
Fugitives
Macedonian expatriates in Hungary
Macedonian politicians convicted of crimes